Valley of the Dolls may refer to:

 Valley of the Dolls (novel), a 1966 novel by Jacqueline Susann
 Valley of the Dolls (film), a 1967 film adapted from the novel
 "(Theme from) Valley of the Dolls", the title song from the film, performed by Dionne Warwick
 Dionne Warwick in Valley of the Dolls, a 1967 album
 Valley of the Dolls (play), a 1996 stage production, adapted from the 1967 film; starring Kate Flannery
 Jacqueline Susann's Valley of the Dolls, a 1981 TV miniseries adapted from the novel, directed by Walter 
 Valley of the Dolls (TV series), a 1994 soap opera adapted from the novel, starring Sally Kirkland
 Valley of the Dolls (album), a 1979 album by Generation X, or the title song
 "Valley of the Dolls", a song from the 2012 album Electra Heart by Marina and the Diamonds
 "Valley of the Dolls", a song from the 1980 soundtrack Foxes composed and performed by Giorgio Moroder for the 1980 film Foxes
 Beyond the Valley of the Dolls, a 1970 American film